Cnemosioma innominata is a species of beetle in the family Cerambycidae, and the only species in the genus Cnemosioma. It was described by Martins in 1975.

References

Onciderini
Beetles described in 1975